

Events

Pre-1600
 708 – Copper coins are minted in Japan for the first time (Traditional Japanese date: August 10, 708).
 870 – The city of Melite surrenders to an Aghlabid army following a siege, putting an end to Byzantine Malta.
1009 – Mainz Cathedral suffers extensive damage from a fire, which destroys the building on the day of its inauguration.
1219 – Battle of Fariskur during the Fifth Crusade
1261 – Pope Urban IV succeeds Pope Alexander IV, becoming the 182nd pope.
1315 – Battle of Montecatini: The army of the Republic of Pisa, commanded by Uguccione della Faggiuola, wins a decisive victory against the joint forces of the Kingdom of Naples and the Republic of Florence despite being outnumbered.
1350 – Battle of Winchelsea (or Les Espagnols sur Mer): The English naval fleet under King Edward III defeats a Castilian fleet of 40 ships.
1475 – The Treaty of Picquigny ends a brief war between  the kingdoms of France and England.
1484 – Pope Innocent VIII succeeds Pope Sixtus IV.
1498 – Vasco da Gama decides to depart Calicut and return to Kingdom of Portugal.
1521 – The Ottoman Turks capture Nándorfehérvár (Belgrade).
1526 – Battle of Mohács: The Ottoman Turks led by Suleiman the Magnificent defeat and kill the last Jagiellonian king of Hungary and Bohemia.
1541 – The Ottoman Turks capture Buda, the capital of the Hungarian Kingdom.
1588 – Toyotomi Hideyoshi issues a nationwide sword hunting ordinance, disarming the peasantry so as to firmly separate the samurai and commoner classes, prevent peasant uprisings, and further centralise his own power.

1601–1900
1728 – The city of Nuuk in Greenland is founded as the fort of Godt-Haab by the royal governor Claus Paarss.
1741 – The eruption of Oshima–Ōshima and the Kampo tsunami: At least 2,000 people along the Japanese coast drown in a tsunami caused by the eruption of Oshima.
1756 – Frederick the Great attacks Saxony, beginning the Seven Years' War in Europe.
1758 – The Treaty of Easton establishes the first American Indian reservation, at Indian Mills, New Jersey, for the Lenape.
1778 – American Revolutionary War: British and American forces battle indecisively at the Battle of Rhode Island.
1779 – American Revolutionary War: American forces battle and defeat the British and Iroquois forces at the Battle of Newtown.
1786 – Shays' Rebellion, an armed uprising of Massachusetts farmers, begins in response to high debt and tax burdens.
1807 – British troops under Sir Arthur Wellesley defeat a Danish militia outside Copenhagen in the Battle of Køge.
1825 – Portuguese and Brazilian diplomats sign the Treaty of Rio de Janeiro, which has Portugal recognise Brazilian independence, formally ending the Brazilian war of independence. The treaty will be ratified by the King of Portugal three months later.
1831 – Michael Faraday discovers electromagnetic induction.
1842 – Treaty of Nanking signing ends the First Opium War.
1861 – American Civil War: The Battle of Hatteras Inlet Batteries gives Federal forces control of Pamlico Sound.
1869 – The Mount Washington Cog Railway opens, making it the world's first mountain-climbing rack railway.
1871 – Emperor Meiji orders the abolition of the han system and the establishment of prefectures as local centers of administration. (Traditional Japanese date: July 14, 1871).
1885 – Gottlieb Daimler patents the world's first internal combustion motorcycle, the Reitwagen.
1898 – The Goodyear tire company is founded in Akron, Ohio

1901–present
1903 – The , the last of the five s, is launched.
1907 – The Quebec Bridge collapses during construction, killing 75 workers.
1910 – The Japan–Korea Treaty of 1910, also known as the Japan–Korea Annexation Treaty, becomes effective, officially starting the period of Japanese rule in Korea.
1911 – Ishi, considered the last Native American to make contact with European Americans, emerges from the wilderness of northeastern California.
  1911   – The Canadian Naval Service becomes the Royal Canadian Navy.
1912 – A typhoon strikes China, killing at least 50,000 people.
1914 – World War I: Start of the Battle of St. Quentin in which the French Fifth Army counter-attacked the invading Germans at Saint-Quentin, Aisne.
1915 – US Navy salvage divers raise , the first U.S. submarine sunk in an accident.
1916 – The United States passes the Philippine Autonomy Act.
1918 – World War I: Bapaume taken by the New Zealand Division in the Hundred Days Offensive.
1930 – The last 36 remaining inhabitants of St Kilda are voluntarily evacuated to other parts of Scotland.
1941 – World War II: Tallinn, the capital of Estonia, is occupied by Nazi Germany following an occupation by the Soviet Union.
1943 – World War II: German-occupied Denmark scuttles most of its navy; Germany dissolves the Danish government.
1944 – World War II:  Slovak National Uprising takes place as 60,000 Slovak troops turn against the Nazis.
1948 – Northwest Airlines Flight 421 crashes in Fountain City, Wisconsin, killing all 37 aboard.
1949 – Soviet atomic bomb project: The Soviet Union tests its first atomic bomb, known as First Lightning or Joe 1, at Semipalatinsk, Kazakhstan.
1950 – Korean War: British Commonwealth Forces Korea arrives to bolster the US presence.
1952 – American experimental composer John Cage’s 4’33” premieres at Maverick Concert Hall, played by American pianist David Tudor.
1958 – United States Air Force Academy opens in Colorado Springs, Colorado.
1965 – The Gemini V spacecraft returns to Earth, landing in the Atlantic Ocean.
1966 – The Beatles perform their last concert before paying fans at Candlestick Park in San Francisco.
  1966   – Leading Egyptian thinker Sayyid Qutb is executed for plotting the assassination of President Gamal Abdel Nasser.
1970 – Chicano Moratorium against the Vietnam War, East Los Angeles, California. Police riot kills three people, including journalist Rubén Salazar.
1975 – El Tacnazo: Peruvian Prime Minister Francisco Morales Bermúdez carries out a coup d’état in the city of Tacna, forcing the sitting President of Peru, Juan Velasco Alvarado, to resign and assuming his place as the new President.
1982 – The synthetic chemical element Meitnerium, atomic number 109, is first synthesized at the Gesellschaft für Schwerionenforschung in Darmstadt, Germany.
1987 – Odaeyang mass suicide: 33 individuals linked to a religious cult are found dead in the attic of a cafeteria in Yongin, South Korea. Investigators attribute their deaths to a murder-suicide pact.
1991 – Supreme Soviet of the Soviet Union suspends all activities of the Soviet Communist Party.
  1991   – Libero Grassi, an Italian businessman from Palermo, is killed by the Sicilian Mafia after taking a solitary stand against their extortion demands.
1996 – Vnukovo Airlines Flight 2801, a Tupolev Tu-154, crashes into a mountain on the Arctic island of Spitsbergen, killing all 141 aboard.
1997 – Netflix is launched as an internet DVD rental service.
  1997   – At least 98 villagers are killed by the Armed Islamic Group of Algeria GIA in the Rais massacre, Algeria.
1998 – Eighty people are killed when Cubana de Aviación Flight 389 crashes during a rejected takeoff from the Old Mariscal Sucre International Airport in Quito, Ecuador.
2001 – Four people are killed when Binter Mediterráneo Flight 8261 crashes into the N-340 highway near Málaga Airport.
2003 – Sayed Ayatollah Mohammed Baqir al-Hakim, the Shia Muslim leader in Iraq, is assassinated in a terrorist bombing, along with nearly 100 worshippers as they leave a mosque in Najaf.
2005 – Hurricane Katrina devastates much of the U.S. Gulf Coast from Louisiana to the Florida Panhandle, killing up to 1,836 people and causing $125 billion in damage.
2012 – At least 26 Chinese miners are killed and 21 missing after a blast in the Xiaojiawan coal mine, located at Panzhihua, Sichuan Province.
  2012   – The XIV Paralympic Games open in London, England, United Kingdom.
2022 – Russo-Ukrainian War: Ukraine begins its southern counteroffensive in the Kherson Oblast, eventually culminating in the liberation of the city of Kherson.

Births

Pre-1600
 979 – Otto (or Eudes), French nobleman (d. 1045)
1321 – John of Artois, French nobleman  (d. 1387)
1347 – John Hastings, 2nd Earl of Pembroke, English nobleman and soldier (d. 1375)
1434 – Janus Pannonius, Hungarian bishop and poet (d. 1472)
1514 – García Álvarez de Toledo, 4th Marquis of Villafranca, Spanish noble and admiral (d. 1577)
1534 – Nicholas Pieck, Dutch Franciscan friar and martyr (d. 1572)
1597 – Henry Gage, Royalist officer in the English Civil War (d. 1645)

1601–1900
1619 – Jean-Baptiste Colbert, French economist and politician, Controller-General of Finances (d. 1683)
1628 – John Granville, 1st Earl of Bath, English soldier and politician, Lord Lieutenant of Ireland (d. 1701)
1632 – John Locke, English physician and philosopher (d. 1704)
1724 – Giovanni Battista Casti, Italian poet and author (d. 1803)
1725 – Charles Townshend, English politician, Chancellor of the Exchequer (d. 1767)
1728 – Maria Anna Sophia of Saxony, electress of Bavaria (d. 1797)
1756 – Jan Śniadecki, Polish mathematician and astronomer (d. 1830)
1756 – Count Heinrich von Bellegarde, Austrian general and politician (d. 1845)
1772 – James Finlayson, Scottish Quaker (d. 1852)
1773 – Aimé Bonpland, French botanist and explorer (d. 1858)
1777 – Hyacinth, Russian religious leader, founded Sinology (d. 1853)
1780 – Jean-Auguste-Dominique Ingres, French painter and illustrator (d. 1867)
1792 – Charles Grandison Finney, American minister and author (d. 1875)
1805 – Frederick Denison Maurice, English priest, theologian, and author (d. 1872)
1809 – Oliver Wendell Holmes Sr., American physician and author (d. 1894)
1810 – Juan Bautista Alberdi, Argentinian theorist and diplomat (d. 1884)
1813 – Henry Bergh, American activist, founded the ASPCA (d. 1888)
1842 – Alfred Shaw, English cricketer, rugby player, and umpire (d. 1907)
1843 – David B. Hill, American lawyer and politician, 29th Governor of New York (d. 1910)
1844 – Edward Carpenter, English anthologist and poet (d. 1929)
1857 – Sandford Schultz, English cricketer (d. 1937)
1861 – Byron G. Harlan, American singer (d. 1936)
1862 – Andrew Fisher, Scottish-Australian politician and diplomat, 5th Prime Minister of Australia (d. 1928)
  1862   – Maurice Maeterlinck, Belgian poet and playwright, Nobel Prize laureate (d. 1949)
1871 – Albert François Lebrun, French engineer and politician, 15th President of France (d. 1950)
1875 – Leonardo De Lorenzo, Italian flute player and educator (d. 1962)
1876 – Charles F. Kettering, American engineer and businessman, founded Delco Electronics (d. 1958)
  1876   – Kim Koo, South Korean politician, 6th President of The Provisional Government of the Republic of Korea (d. 1949)
1879 – Han Yong-un, Korean independence activist, reformer, and poet (d. 1944)
1887 – Jivraj Narayan Mehta, Indian physicians and politician, 1st Chief Minister of Gujarat (d. 1978)
1888 – Salme Dutt, Estonian-English politician (d. 1964)
1890 – Peder Furubotn, Norwegian Communist and anti-Nazi Resistance leader (d.1975)
1891 – Marquis James, American journalist and author (d. 1955)
1898 – Preston Sturges, American director and producer (d. 1959)

1901–present
1901 – Aurèle Joliat, Canadian ice hockey player and referee (d. 1986)
1904 – Werner Forssmann, German physician and academic, Nobel Prize laureate (d. 1979)
1905 – Dhyan Chand, Indian field hockey player (d. 1979)
  1905   – Arndt Pekurinen, Finnish activist (d. 1941)
1910 – Vivien Thomas, American surgeon and academic (d. 1985)
1911 – John Charnley, British orthopedic surgeon (d. 1982)
1912 – Sohn Kee-chung, South Korean runner (d. 2002)
  1912   – Barry Sullivan, American actor (d. 1994)
  1912   – Wolfgang Suschitzky, Austrian-English cinematographer and photographer (d. 2016)
1913 – Len Butterfield, New Zealand cricketer (d. 1999)
1913 – Jackie Mitchell, American baseball pitcher (d. 1987)
1915 – Ingrid Bergman, Swedish actress (d. 1982)
  1915   – Nathan Pritikin, American nutritionist and author (d. 1985)
1916 – Luther Davis, American playwright and screenwriter (d. 2008)
1917 – Isabel Sanford, American actress (d. 2004)
1920 – Charlie Parker, American saxophonist and composer (d. 1955)
  1920   – Herb Simpson, American baseball player (d. 2015)
  1920   – Otis Boykin, American inventor and engineer (d. 1982)
1922 – Richard Blackwell, American actor, fashion designer, and critic (d. 2008)
  1922   – John Edward Williams, American author and educator (d. 1994)
  1922   – Arthur Anderson, American actor (d. 2016)
1923 – Richard Attenborough, English actor, director, and producer (d. 2014)
1924 – Dinah Washington, American singer and pianist (d. 1963)
1926 – Helene Ahrweiler, Greek historian and academic
  1926   – Donn Fendler, American author and speaker (d. 2016)
  1926   – Betty Lynn, American actress (d. 2021)
1927 – Jimmy C. Newman, American singer-songwriter and guitarist (d. 2014)
1928 – Herbert Meier, Swiss author and translator (d. 2018)
1929 – Thom Gunn, English-American poet and academic (d. 2004)
1930 – Jacques Bouchard, Canadian businessman (d. 2006)
  1930   – Carlos Loyzaga, Filipino basketball player and coach (d. 2016)
1931 – Stelios Kazantzidis, Greek singer and guitarist (d. 2001)
  1931   – Lise Payette, Canadian journalist and politician (d. 2018)
1933 – Sorel Etrog, Romanian-Canadian sculptor, painter, and illustrator (d. 2014)
  1933   – Arnold Koller, Swiss politician
1934 – Dimitris Papamichael, Greek actor and director (d. 2004)
1935 – Hugo Brandt Corstius, Dutch linguist and author (d. 2014)
  1935   – William Friedkin, American director, producer, and screenwriter
  1935   – László Garai, Hungarian psychologist and scholar (d. 2019)
1936 – John McCain, American captain and politician (d. 2018)
1937 – James Florio, American commander, lawyer, and politician, 49th Governor of New Jersey
1938 – Elliott Gould, American actor and producer
  1938   – Angela Huth, English journalist and author
  1938   – Christian Müller, German footballer and manager
  1938   – Robert Rubin, American lawyer and politician, 70th United States Secretary of the Treasury
1939 – Jolán Kleiber-Kontsek, Hungarian discus thrower and shot putter
  1939   – Joel Schumacher, American director, producer, and screenwriter (d. 2020)
1940 – James Brady, American politician and activist, 15th White House Press Secretary (d. 2014)
  1940   – Gary Gabelich, American race car driver (d. 1984)
1941 – Robin Leach, English journalist and television host (d. 2018)
1942 – James Glennon, American cinematographer (d. 2006)
  1942   – Gottfried John, German actor (d. 2014)
  1942   – Sterling Morrison, American singer and guitarist (d. 1995)
1943 – Mohamed Amin, Kenyan photographer and journalist (d. 1996)
  1943   – Dick Halligan, American pianist and composer 
  1943   – Arthur B. McDonald, Canadian astrophysicist and academic, Nobel Prize laureate
1945 – Chris Copping, English singer-songwriter and guitarist 
  1945   – Wyomia Tyus, American sprinter
1946 – Bob Beamon, American long jumper
  1946   – Francine D. Blau, American economist and academic
  1946   – Demetris Christofias, Cypriot businessman and politician, 6th President of Cyprus (d. 2019)
  1946   – Giorgio Orsoni, Italian lawyer and politician, 17th Mayor of Venice
1947 – Temple Grandin, American ethologist, academic, and author
  1947   – James Hunt, English race car driver and sportscaster (d. 1993)
1948 – Robert S. Langer, American chemical engineer, entrepreneur, and academic
1949 – Stan Hansen, American wrestler and actor
1950 – Doug DeCinces, American baseball player
  1950   – Frank Henenlotter, American director and screenwriter
  1950   – Dave Reichert, American soldier and politician
1951 – Geoff Whitehorn, English singer-songwriter and guitarist
1952 – Karen Hesse, American author and poet
  1952   – Dave Malone, American singer-songwriter and guitarist 
  1952   – Don Schlitz, American Hall of Fame country music songwriter 
1953 – David Boaz, American businessman and author 
  1953   – Richard Harding, English rugby player
  1953   – James Quesada, Nicaraguan-American anthropologist and academic
1954 – Michael P. Kube-McDowell, American journalist, author, and academic
1955 – Diamanda Galás, American singer-songwriter and pianist
  1955   – Jack Lew, American lawyer and politician, 25th White House Chief of Staff
1956 – Mark Morris, American dancer and choreographer
  1956   – Eddie Murray, American football player
  1956   – Charalambos Xanthopoulos, Greek footballer
  1956   – Steve Yarbrough, American novelist and short story writer
1957 – Jerry D. Bailey, American jockey and sportscaster
  1957   – Grzegorz Ciechowski, Polish singer-songwriter, film music composer (d. 2001)
1958 – Lenny Henry, English comedian, actor, and screenwriter
  1958   – Michael Jackson, American singer-songwriter, producer, dancer, and actor (d. 2009) 
1959 – Rebecca De Mornay, American actress
  1959   – Ramón Díaz, Argentinian footballer and manager
  1959   – Ray Elgaard, Canadian football player
  1959   – Chris Hadfield, Canadian colonel, pilot, and astronaut
  1959   – Eddi Reader, Scottish singer-songwriter, guitarist, and producer 
  1959   – Timothy Shriver, American businessman and activist 
  1959   – Stephen Wolfram, English-American physicist and mathematician
  1959   – Nagarjuna, Indian film actor, Producer and Businessman 
1960 – Todd English, American chef and author
  1960   – Tony MacAlpine, American guitarist, songwriter, and producer 
1961 – Carsten Fischer, German field hockey player
  1961   – Rodney McCray, American basketball player
1962 – Carl Banks, American football player and sportscaster
  1962   – Hiroki Kikuta, Japanese game designer and composer 
  1962   – Ian James Corlett, Canadian voice actor, writer, producer and author
  1962   – Simon Thurley, English historian and academic
1963 – Elizabeth Fraser, Scottish singer-songwriter 
1964 – Perri "Pebbles" Reid, American dance-pop and urban contemporary singer-songwriter 
  1964   – Zisis Tsekos, Greek footballer
1965 – Will Perdue, American basketball player and sportscaster
  1965   – Geir-Inge Sivertsen, Norwegian politician and engineer, Norwegian Minister of Fisheries and Seafood
1966 – Jörn Großkopf, German footballer and manager
1967 – Neil Gorsuch, American lawyer and jurist, Associate Justice of the Supreme Court of the United States
  1967   – Anton Newcombe, American singer-songwriter and guitarist 
1968 – Meshell Ndegeocello, German-American singer-songwriter
1969 – Joe Swail, Northern Irish snooker player
  1969   – Jennifer Crittenden, American screenwriter and producer
  1969   – Lucero, Mexican singer, songwriter, actress, and television host
1971 – Henry Blanco, Venezuelan baseball player and coach
  1971   – Alex Griffin, English bass player 
  1971   – Carla Gugino, American actress 
1972 – Amanda Marshall, Canadian singer-songwriter
  1972   – Bae Yong-joon, South Korean actor
1973 – Vincent Cavanagh, English singer and guitarist 
  1973   – Olivier Jacque, French motorcycle racer
1974 – Kumi Tanioka, Japanese keyboard player and composer
1975 – Kyle Cook, American singer-songwriter and guitarist 
1976 – Stephen Carr, Irish footballer
  1976   – Phil Harvey, English businessman
  1976   – Kevin Kaesviharn, American football player
  1976   – Georgios Kalaitzis, Greek basketball player
  1976   – Pablo Mastroeni, Argentine-American soccer player and manager
  1976   – Jon Dahl Tomasson, Danish footballer and manager
1977 – Cayetano, Greek DJ and producer
  1977   – Devean George, American basketball player
  1977   – John Patrick O'Brien, American soccer player
  1977   – Roy Oswalt, American baseball player
  1977   – Charlie Pickering, Australian comedian and radio host
  1977   – Aaron Rowand, American baseball player and sportscaster
1978 – Volkan Arslan, German-Turkish footballer
  1978   – Celestine Babayaro, Nigerian footballer
1979 – Stijn Devolder, Belgian cyclist
  1979   – Kristjan Rahnu, Estonian decathlete
  1979   – Ryan Shealy, American baseball player 
1980 – Chris Simms, American football player
  1980   – David West, American basketball player
1981 – Geneviève Jeanson, Canadian cyclist
  1981   – Jay Ryan, New Zealand-Australian actor and producer
1982 – Ruhila Adatia-Sood, Kenyan journalist and radio host (d. 2013)
  1982   – Carlos Delfino, Argentinian-Italian basketball player
  1982   – Vincent Enyeama, Nigerian footballer
1983 – Antti Niemi, Finnish ice hockey player
1986 – Hajime Isayama, Japanese illustrator
  1986   – Lea Michele, American actress and singer
1987 – Tony Kane, Irish footballer
1990 – Jakub Kosecki, Polish footballer
  1990   – Patrick van Aanholt, Dutch footballer
1991 – Néstor Araujo, Mexican footballer
  1991   – Deshaun Thomas, American basketball player
1992 – Mallu Magalhães, Brazilian singer-songwriter 
  1992   – Noah Syndergaard, American baseball player
1993 – Liam Payne, English singer-songwriter
1994 – Ysaline Bonaventure, Belgian tennis player

Deaths

Pre-1600
 886 – Basil I, Byzantine emperor (b. 811)
 939 – Wang Jipeng, Chinese emperor of Min
   939   – Li Chunyan, Chinese empress 
 956 – Fu the Elder, Chinese empress
 979 – Abu Taghlib, Hamdanid emir
1021 – Minamoto no Yorimitsu, Japanese nobleman (b. 948)
1046 – Gerard of Csanád Venetian monk and Hungarian bishop (b.980) 
1093 – Hugh I, duke of Burgundy (b. 1057)
1123 – Eystein I, king of Norway (b. 1088)
1135 – Al-Mustarshid, Abbasid caliph (b. 1092)
1159 – Bertha of Sulzbach, Byzantine empress
1298 – Eleanor of England, Countess of Bar, English princess (b. 1269)
1315 – Peter Tempesta, Italian nobleman (b. 1291)
  1315   – Charles of Taranto, Italian nobleman (b. 1296)
1395 – Albert III, duke of Austria (b. 1349)
1442 – John V, duke of Brittany (b. 1389)
1499 – Alesso Baldovinetti, Florentine painter (b. 1427)
1523 – Ulrich von Hutten, Lutheran reformer (b. 1488)
1526 – Louis II, king of Hungary and Croatia (b. 1506)
  1526   – Pál Tomori Hungarian archbishop and soldier (b. 1475)
1533 – Atahualpa, Inca emperor (b. 1497)
1542 – Cristóvão da Gama, Portuguese commander (b. 1516)

1601–1900
1604 – Hamida Banu Begum, Mughal empress (b. 1527)
1657 – John Lilburne, English activist (b. 1614)
1712 – Gregory King, English genealogist, engraver, and statistician (b. 1648)
1749 – Matthias Bel, Hungarian pastor and polymath (b. 1684)
1769 – Edmond Hoyle, English author and educator (b. 1672)
1780 – Jacques-Germain Soufflot, French architect, co-designed The Panthéon (b. 1713)
1799 – Pius VI, pope of the Catholic Church (b. 1717)
1844 – Edmund Ignatius Rice, Irish missionary and educator, founded the Christian Brothers and Presentation Brothers (b. 1762)
1856 – Mary Anne Schimmelpenninck, English author and activist (b. 1778)
1866 – Tokugawa Iemochi, Japanese shōgun (b. 1846)
1877 – Brigham Young, American religious leader, 2nd President of The Church of Jesus Christ of Latter-day Saints (b. 1801)
1889 – Stefan Dunjov, Bulgarian colonel (b. 1815)
1891 – Pierre Lallement, French businessman, invented the bicycle (b. 1843)
1892 – William Forbes Skene, Scottish historian and author (b. 1809)

1901–present
1904 – Murad V, Ottoman sultan (b. 1840)
1911 – Mir Mahboob Ali Khan, 6th Nizam of Hyderabad (b.1866)
1917 – George Huntington Hartford, American businessman (b. 1833) 
1930 – William Archibald Spooner, English priest and author (b. 1844)
1931 – David T. Abercrombie, American businessman, co-founded Abercrombie & Fitch (b. 1867)
1932 – Raymond Knister, Canadian poet and author (b. 1899)
1944 – Attik, Greek pianist and composer (b. 1885)
1946 – Adolphus Busch III, American businessman (b. 1891)
  1946   – John Steuart Curry, American painter and academic (b. 1897)
1951 – Sydney Chapman, English economist and civil servant (b. 1871)
1952 – Anton Piëch, Austrian lawyer (b. 1894)
1958 – Marjorie Flack, American author and illustrator (b. 1897)
1966 – Sayyid Qutb, Egyptian theorist, author, and poet (b. 1906)
1968 – Ulysses S. Grant III, American general (b. 1881)
1971 – Nathan Freudenthal Leopold Jr., American murderer (b. 1904)
1972 – Lale Andersen, German singer-songwriter (b. 1905)
1975 – Éamon de Valera, Irish soldier and politician, 3rd President of Ireland (b. 1882)
1977 – Jean Hagen, American actress (b. 1923)
  1977   – Brian McGuire, Australian race car driver (b. 1945)
1979 – Gertrude Chandler Warner, American author and educator (b. 1890)
1981 – Lowell Thomas, American journalist and author (b. 1892)
1982 – Ingrid Bergman, Swedish actress (b. 1915)
  1982   – Lehman Engel, American composer and conductor (b. 1910)
1985 – Evelyn Ankers, British-American actress (b. 1918)
1987 – Archie Campbell, American actor and screenwriter (b. 1914)
  1987   – Lee Marvin, American actor (b. 1924)
1989 – Peter Scott, English explorer and painter (b. 1909)
1990 – Manly Palmer Hall, Canadian-American mystic and author (b. 1901)
1991 – Libero Grassi, Italian businessman (b. 1924)
1992 – Félix Guattari, French philosopher and theorist (b. 1930)
1995 – Frank Perry, American director, producer, and screenwriter (b. 1930)
2000 – Shelagh Fraser, English actress (b. 1922)
  2000   – Willie Maddren, English footballer and manager (b. 1951)
  2000   – Conrad Marca-Relli, American-Italian painter and academic (b. 1913)
2001 – Graeme Strachan, Australian singer-songwriter & television personality (b. 1952)
  2001   – Francisco Rabal, Spanish actor, director, and screenwriter (b. 1926)
2002 – Lance Macklin, English race car driver (b. 1919)
2003 – Mohammad Baqir al-Hakim, Iraqi politician (b. 1939)
  2003   – Patrick Procktor, English painter and academic (b. 1936)
2004 – Hans Vonk, Dutch conductor (b. 1942)
2007 – James Muir Cameron Fletcher, New Zealand businessman (b. 1914)
  2007   – Richard Jewell, American police officer (b. 1962)
  2007   – Pierre Messmer, French civil servant and politician, 154th Prime Minister of France (b. 1916)
  2007   – Alfred Peet, Dutch-American businessman, founded Peet's Coffee & Tea (b. 1920)
2008 – Geoffrey Perkins, English actor, producer, and screenwriter (b. 1953)
  2008   – Michael Schoenberg, American geophysicist and theorist (b. 1939)
2011 – Honeyboy Edwards, American singer-songwriter and guitarist (b. 1915)
  2011   – Junpei Takiguchi, Japanese voice actor (b. 1931)
2012 – Ruth Goldbloom, Canadian academic and philanthropist, co-founded Pier 21 (b. 1923)
  2012   – Nicholas Goodrick-Clarke, English historian and author (b. 1953)
  2012   – Shoshichi Kobayashi, Japanese-American mathematician and academic (b. 1932)
  2012   – Anne McKnight, American soprano (b. 1924)
  2012   – Les Moss, American baseball player, coach, and manager (b. 1925)
  2012   – Sergei Ovchinnikov, Russian volleyball player and coach (b. 1969)
2013 – Joan L. Krajewski, American lawyer and politician (b. 1934)
  2013   – Medardo Joseph Mazombwe, Zambian cardinal (b. 1931)
  2013   – Bruce C. Murray, American geologist and academic, co-founded The Planetary Society (b. 1931)
2014 – Octavio Brunetti, Argentinian pianist and composer (b. 1975)
  2014   – Björn Waldegård, Swedish race car driver (b. 1943)
2016 – Gene Wilder, American stage and screen comic actor, screenwriter, film director, and author (b. 1933)
2018 – James Mirrlees, Scottish economist, Nobel Prize laureate (b. 1936)
  2018   – Paul Taylor, American choreographer (b. 1930)
2021 – Ed Asner, American actor (b. 1929)
  2021   – Lee "Scratch" Perry, Jamaican reggae producer (b. 1936)
  2021   – Jacques Rogge, Olympic sailor and Orthopedic Surgeon who served as the 8th President of the International Olympic Committee (b. 1942)

Holidays and observances
Christian feast day:
Adelphus of Metz
Beheading of St. John the Baptist
Eadwold of Cerne
Euphrasia Eluvathingal (Syro-Malabar Catholic Church)
John Bunyan (Episcopal Church)
Sabina
Vitalis, Sator and Repositus
August 29 (Eastern Orthodox liturgics)
International Day against Nuclear Tests
Miners' Day (Ukraine)
Day of Remembrance of the Defenders of Ukraine (Ukraine)
Municipal Police Day (Poland)
National Sports Day (India)
Slovak National Uprising Anniversary (Slovakia)
Telugu Language Day (India)

References

External links

 
 
 

Days of the year
August